Spanish Ship Bay is a small community in the Canadian province of Nova Scotia, located in the Municipality of the District of Saint Mary's in Guysborough County.

Etymology 
Spanish Ship Bay is said to have been so named because a Spanish galleon had run aground there, or because a headland nearby is shaped somewhat like a ship.

References

External links
Spanish Ship Bay on Destination Nova Scotia
Spanish Ship Bay war Memorial
 Spanish Ship Bay  agriculture profile

Communities in Guysborough County, Nova Scotia
General Service Areas in Nova Scotia